The Shashe River (or Shashi River) is a major left-bank tributary of the Limpopo River in Zimbabwe.  It rises northwest of Francistown, Botswana and flows into the Limpopo River where Botswana, Zimbabwe and South Africa meet. 
The confluence is at the site of the Greater Mapungubwe Transfrontier Conservation Area.

Hydrology 
The Shashe River is a highly ephemeral river, with flow generally restricted to a few days of the year. The river contributes 12.2% of the mean annual runoff of the Limpopo Basin.

Major tributaries of the Shashe River include the Simukwe, Shashani, Thuli, Tati and Ramokgwebana rivers. The lower Shashe is a sand filled channel, with extensive alluvial aquifers in the river channel and below the alluvial plains. These supply water for a number of irrigation schemes including Sibasa and Shashi.

More than two million years ago, the Upper Zambezi River used to flow south through what is now the Makgadikgadi Pan (presently a vast seasonal wetland) to the Shashe River and thence the Limpopo River.

Settlements

There is a road bridge and a rail bridge south of Francistown.
The lower Shashe River forms the border between Botswana and Zimbabwe and is unbridged. 
However, at Tuli, both sides of the river are in Zimbabwe and there are two legal crossing points.
The Shashi runs through the Shashi Irrigation Scheme and the Tuli Block.

Dams

The Shashe River is dammed near Francistown at Shashe Dam.  The original purpose was to supply water to the industrial city of Selebi-Phikwe. 
In 1982 it was found that groundwater from the local wells in Francistown had high levels of nitrate, and was also inadequate to meet public demand, 
so the public water supply for that city was changed over to using water from the Shashe Dam.
The dam also supplies water to surrounding villages, Phoenix Mine (Tati Nickel Mining Company/Norilsk Nickel) and Mupane Gold Mine (IAMGOLD).

Further downstream, the Dikgatlhong Dam impounds the Shashe near the village of Robelela, completed in December 2011.
When full it will hold .
A pipeline from the Dikgatlhong Dam will connect to the North-South Carrier (NSC) pipeline at the BPT1 break pressure tank at Moralane.
The NSC will take the water south to Gaborone.

See also 

 Geological changes to the course of the Zambezi River
 Mathangwane Village
 Thuli River

References
Citations

Sources

 

 
Rivers of Botswana
International rivers of Africa
Botswana–Zimbabwe border
Geography of Matabeleland South Province
Tributaries of the Limpopo River